A by-election was held for the New South Wales Legislative Assembly electorate of Leichhardt on 10 December 1932 because of the death of Barney Olde, .

Dates

Result

Preferences were not distributed.The by-election was triggered by the death of Barney Olde, .

See also
Electoral results for the district of Leichhardt (New South Wales)
List of New South Wales state by-elections

References

New South Wales state by-elections
1932 elections in Australia
1930s in New South Wales